In his early years, Scott had been an organist in the Dundee area, before training for the priesthood under the guidance of Reverend Clifford Jones.

William Sievwright Scott  (1 February 1946 – 17 July 2020) was an Anglican priest who served within the Ecclesiastical Household of the Queen of the United Kingdom as Domestic Chaplain to Elizabeth II at Buckingham Palace, Deputy Clerk of the Closet, Sub-Almoner, and Sub-Dean of the Chapel Royal. As such, he was the only full-time clerical member of the Royal Household of the United Kingdom.

As Deputy Clerk of the Closet, Scott was responsible for assisting the Clerk of the Closet in advising the Private Secretary to the Sovereign on candidates to fill vacancies in the Roll of Chaplains to the Sovereign. As Sub-Dean of the Chapel Royal, Scott was responsible for providing for the spiritual needs of the Sovereign and for overseeing the daily operations of the Chapel Royal including its choirs and staff of priests. As Sub-Almoner, Scott was responsible for the daily operations of the Royal Almonry, the alms giving office of the Royal Household. Among other functions, the Royal Almonry oversees the annual Royal Maundy Service, in which the Queen distributes small red and white purses of specially minted silver coins to retired pensioners.
 
Prior to 7 November 2007, Scott served as the Chaplain of The Queen's Chapel of the Savoy and the Chaplain of the Royal Victorian Order. Previously, he had served as Vicar of the well known Anglo-Catholic church of St Mary's Church, Bourne Street, London.

In December 2014, Scott was appointed a Commander of the Royal Victorian Order (CVO) by Elizabeth II.

Scott died on 17 July 2020, at the age of 74.

References

 

 
 
 

1946 births
2020 deaths
21st-century English Anglican priests
British chaplains
Commanders of the Royal Victorian Order
Deputy Clerks of the Closet